Produce 48 was the third season of the South Korean reality competition series Produce 101. It was a large-scale project in which the public "produces" a girl group by voting for members out of a pool of 96 contestants from South Korea and Japan, as well as voting for the group's concept, name and debut single. The show was a collaboration between the Mnet series Produce 101 and the J-pop idol group AKB48. The winning 12 contestants, with no nationality caps, as voted only by Korean viewers, would promote as a group for two years and six months. The program itself is primarily in Korean, however staff and trainer instructions were translated onsite by interpreters. The show announced the final 12 members who made it into, as well as the official name of the group Iz*One during the finale on August 31, 2018.

Produced by AKATV (the company that also produced the second season of Produce 101) for Mnet, the show premiered on June 15, 2018, and concluded on August 31, 2018, with 12 episodes. It was directed by An Junyung, who also directed the first two seasons of Produce 101.

Concept and format
Produce 48 brought together 96 girls from idol groups and entertainment companies in Japan and South Korea to form a 12-person Korean-Japanese group that would promote for two and a half years. Formed as a collaboration between Mnet and Yasushi Akimoto, the project planned to adopt the AKB48's concept of "idols you can meet and greet" and be able to perform in a designated theatre. Members of the group are able to promote under their own agencies concurrently, as the show, and the groups' promotions thereafter, are recorded in batches.

The show started with 96 contestants, who were initially grouped into several classes. Episodic competitions were featured in which girls performed in teams on various songs, and were voted by the studio audience, with the winning teams receiving a number of bonus votes to apply to their overall vote count. The viewer-submitted votes were then applied and the girls were ranked, with certain episodes being elimination rounds to reduce the remaining number of contestants.

Of the 96 contestants, 57 of them were from South Korean idol groups and companies, and the other 39 were from Japanese idol groups, consisting of current members of AKB48 and their sister groups. The final 12 were selected regardless of nationality.

Promotions and broadcast
The concept for Produce 48 was revealed at the 2017 Mnet Asian Music Awards in Japan on November 29, 2017, following a joint performance by AKB48 and South Korean artists Weki Meki, Chungha, Pristin, Idol School and Fromis 9. In February 2018, Mnet stated that it would not use the speculated format of having 48 girls from South Korea and 48 girls from Japan competing separately, or that six members of each country would be selected.

The first teaser for the show was released on April 11, 2018. On April 22, the series' theme song "Nekkoya (Pick Me)" (내꺼야 (Pick Me)) was recorded by the contestants of the show with HKT48's Sakura Miyawaki and Lee Ka-eun as center. The winners of the previous series, I.O.I and Wanna One, made appearances at the recording. Produce 48's contestants performed the theme song on Episode 570 of M Countdown in May 2018.

The show premiered on June 15, 2018, on Mnet in South Korea and Mnet Japan. It is also being broadcast in Japan on BS Sky PerfecTV. CJ E&M is also live streaming the series on their TVing Global service. The series was broadcast on tvN Asia in Hong Kong, Singapore, Macau, Malaysia, Indonesia, Taiwan, Thailand, Sri Lanka, the Philippines, Cambodia and Myanmar where it premiered on June 21, 2018.

Staff members
The series was presented by Lee Seung-gi. Other artists featured as cast members:
 Vocal trainers:
 Lee Hong-gi
 Soyou
 Dance trainers:
 Bae Yoon-jeong
 Choi Young-jun
 May J Lee
 Rap trainer:
 Cheetah
 Special MC's:
 Jeon So-mi (Episodes 1 and 5)
 Kang Daniel (Episode 1)
 Kim Chung-ha (Episode 5)
 Bora (Position Evaluation - Episodes 6 and 7)

One-day Dance Judge: Kahi (Episode 1-2)

One-day Healing Mentor: Bora (Episode 11)

Contestants

Color key (In order of contestant's rank on the show)

Episodes

Ranking
The top 12 contestants were chosen through popularity online voting (open internationally) at Produce 2020'''s homepage and audience's live voting. The results were shown at the end of each episode. This ranking determined the 12 trainees who would form the unit girl group.

 Color key

Result

The finale was held on August 31, 2018, and was broadcast live. Lee Seung-gi announced the unit girl group name, IZ*ONE (Hangul: 아이즈원).

Discography
Extended plays

Singles

Ratings
In the table below, the blue numbers represent the lowest ratings and the red numbers represent the highest ratings.

 NR rating means "not reported". The rating is low.

Aftermath
 Iz*One released their debut extended play (EP) Color*Iz on October 29, 2018. Since then, they have released two studio albums (one in Korean and one in Japanese), four EPs and three Japanese singles. After two and a half years of activities, Iz*One disbanded on April 29, 2021, following their contract expiration.
Nako Yabuki and Hitomi Honda returned to activities with HKT48 and AKB48, respectively. Yabuki will graduate from HKT48 in spring 2023 to focus on her acting career.
 Kwon Eun-bi debuted as a soloist on August 24, 2021, with her first EP, Open.
 Jo Yu-ri debuted as a soloist on October 7, 2021, with her first single album, Glassy.
Kim Min-ju and Urban Works announced in October 2021 that she would focus on her acting career. She later left Urban Works and signed with Management SOOP in September 2022.
 Jang Won-young and An Yu-jin debuted in Starship Entertainment's new girl group Ive with their first single album, Eleven, on December 1, 2021.
Kang Hye-won debuted as a soloist on December 22 with her first extended play, W. She also debuted as an actress in the third season of web drama Best Mistake, which began airing on December 28.
Choi Ye-na starred in the second season of the web drama The World of My 17 and hosted several variety shows. She debuted as a soloist on January 17, 2022, with her first mini-album, Smiley.
 Sakura Miyawaki and Kim Chae-won (alongside former Pledis Entertainment trainee Huh Yunjin ) signed with Hybe and Source Music and debuted in their new girl group Le Sserafim on May 2, 2022, with their first mini album, Fearless. Miyawaki had graduated from HKT48 and held her graduation concert on June 19, 2021, while Kim had left Woollim Entertainment. Although their signing was reported by external outlets in mid-2021, their status as Source artists was confirmed in March 2022.
 Lee Chae-yeon competed on Street Woman Fighter as part of the WANT dance crew. She debuted as a soloist with her first EP, Hush Rush, on October 12, 2022.

 Other 48 Group members returned to their respective groups and continued with releasing singles and music videos, including "No Way Man," "Mimi wo Fusage!" and "Wakariyasukute Gomen". 
"NO WAY MAN" was a normal AKB48 single and included Produce48 winners Honda Hitomi, Miyawaki Sakura and Yabuki Nako in addition to the other four Japanese finalists Miyazaki Miho, Takeuchi Miyu, Shiato Miu, and Shiroma Miru.  The single also featured Tanaka Miku, who resigned from the show, along with other AKB48 group members. "Wakariyasukute Gomen", one of the single's B-Sides, featured members of the AKB48 groups that made it past the 1st elimination round but were eliminated before the finals (their ranks varied from 22nd to 52nd).  The other B-side from the singe, "Mimi wo Fusage!", was performed by Japanese contestants who were eliminated in the first round of voting (ranks varied from 59th to 91st), not including those who resigned.
 AKB48's Minami Sato was promoted from Kenkyusei to team A on September 12, 2019.
 AKB48's Erii Chiba participated in the Mnet reality TV show "UHSN".
 Some trainees returned to their original groups or set to debut in rookie groups by their respective agencies:
  Stone Music's Jang Gyu-ri returned as a member of Fromis 9 for their first single album From.9 on October 10, 2018 & departed from the group after her original record with Off The Record Entertainment expired on July 31, 2022.
 FNC's Park Hae-yoon debuted in girl group Cherry Bullet on January 21, 2019.
 Music Works's Yoon Hae-sol debuted in girl group Aqua on November 16, 2018. The group is said to have quietly disbanded.
 FENT's Kim Do-ah debuted in Flavor, the first sub-unit of girl group FANATICS, on November 26, 2018, and the full group on August 6, 2019.
 Yuehua's Kim Si-hyeon and Wang Yi-ren debuted in girl group Everglow on March 18, 2019.
 Woollim's Kim So-hee & Kim Su-yun, and former AKB48 member Juri Takahashi debuted in girl group Rocket Punch on August 7, 2019.
Individual trainee Park Jinny joined Vine Entertainment and debuted in girl group Secret Number on May 19, 2020. 
RBW's Na Goeun and Park Jieun debuted in girl group Purple Kiss on March 15, 2021. Ji-eun left the group on November 18, 2022.
Han Chowon debuted in Cube Entertainment's  girl group Lightsum alongside former Banana Culture trainee Kim Nayoung, and former CNC Entertainment trainee Lee Yujeong on June 10, 2021.
A Team's Kim Choyeon and former Million Market trainee Son Eunchae debuted in girl group BugAboo on October 25, 2021. The group disbanded on December 8, 2022. After the group's disbandment both Kim Choyeon and Son Eunchae left A Team and joined Carrie TV.
 Some trainees debuted as soloists:
 ZB Label's Alex Christine debuted as a soloist under the moniker AleXa, and released her debut single Bomb on October 21, 2019.
 (Former) AKB48's Miyu Takeuchi released a solo single, My Type (내 타입) on October 22, 2019, under Mystic Entertainment.
 Some trainees left their agencies/joined new agencies:
 NMB48's Azusa Uemura graduated on December 3, 2018, and began her career as a YouTuber.
 AKB48's Miyu Takeuchi graduated on December 25, 2018. She then signed a contract with Mystic Entertainment.
 AKB48's Juri Takahashi graduated from the group on May 2, 2019. She then signed a contract with Woollim Entertainment and debuted in Rocket Punch.
 AKB48's Mako Kojima graduated on May 12, 2019.
 NGT48's Rena Hasegawa graduated on May 19, 2019. She then signed a contract with Crocodile and began her career as a voice actress.
 AKB48's Ikumi Nakano graduated on May 30, 2019.
 NMB48's Kokoro Naiki graduated on August 11, 2019.
 AKB48's Moe Goto graduated on August 13, 2019. She then signed a contract with Twin Planet and debuted as a soloist.
 HKT48's Amane Tsukiashi graduated on March 31, 2020.
 NMB48's Sae Murase graduated on December 23, 2020.
 NMB48's Miru Shiroma graduated on August 31, 2021.
 SKE48's Jurina Matsui graduated on April 30, 2021.
 NGT48's Noe Yamada announced her graduation in October 2021 and graduated on February 28, 2022.
 AKB48's Miho Miyazaki announced her graduation in December 2021 and will graduate in April 2022 announcing that she will have plans moving to South Korea.
 Hwang So-yeon and Kang Da-min left Wellmade Yedang, then Hwang signed a contract with M&H Entertainment while Kang is now under Starship Entertainment. 
Lee Ga-eun left After School and Pledis Entertainment and released her final single under Pledis, "Remember You," on July 12, 2019. Lee then signed a contract with High Entertainment.
 Go Yu-jin left Blockberry Creative, then she signed a contract with 8D Creative before leaving in Spring 2020.
 Son Eun-chae left Million Market and signed with A Team Entertainment before debuting with BugAboo on October 25, 2021.
 Lee Yu-jeong, Yoon Eun-bin, Kim Da-yeon and Hong Ye-ji left CNC Entertainment, then signed with Stardium Entertainment. Both Lee Yujeong and Kim Dayeon then left Stardium Entertainment; Lee signed with Cube Entertainment in December 2019 and debuted in Lightsum, while Kim signed with Jellyfish Entertainment. Kim participated in the audition program Girls Planet 999 and placed fourth, making her debut with Kep1er under Wake One Entertainment and Swing Entertainment.
 Shin Su-hyun left FAVE Entertainment. She then signed with Sublime Artist Agency. 
 Cho Ah-yeong left FNC Entertainment. She then signed a contract with UPVOTE Entertainment.
 Kim Da-hye and Kim Nayoung left Banana Culture. Kim Nayoung then signed with Cube Entertainment and debuted in Lightsum.
 Yu Min-young left HOW Entertainment and signed a contract with 8D Creative.
 Lee Chae-jeong and Park Minji left MND17. Lee signed with Hunus Entertainment and was added as a new member to girl group Elris for their fourth extended play Jackpot. Park signed with Vine Entertainment and joined Secret Number as a new member, making her debut with their single album Fire Saturday on October 27, 2021.
 Kim Yu-bin left CNC Entertainment. She then signed a contract with MAJOR9 Entertainment and debuted in Bling Bling.
 Kim Minseo and Wang Ke left HOW Entertainment following its closure.
 Cho Yeongjin and Lee Seunghyeon left WM Entertainment. Lee joined Grandline Group and debuted in the group H1-KEY on January 5, 2022, under the stage name Riina.
 Huh Yunjin left Pledis Entertainment. She later joined Hybe and Source Music, where she debuted with their girl group Le Sserafim alongside former Iz*One members Sakura Miyawaki and Kim Chae-won on May 2, 2022.

Vote manipulation investigation

Following allegations of electoral fraud on the final episode of Produce X 101, 272 viewers filed a lawsuit against Mnet. On August 20, 2019, a search warrant was issued on CJ E&M offices and a text voting company by the Seoul Metropolitan Police Agency. During their first search, the police uncovered voice recordings of the staff members discussing vote manipulation on the previous seasons of the show, resulting in them extending their investigation to all four seasons of the Produce 101 series and Idol School. On November 6, 2019, producers Ahn Joon-young and Kim Yong-bum were arrested. During questioning, Ahn admitted to having manipulated the rankings for Produce 48 and Produce X 101. On November 7, 2019, the police revealed that the final rankings of the top 20 trainees during Produce 48 and Produce X 101'' had already been predetermined by the producers before the final performances were recorded and broadcast. On November 18, 2020,  the trial of appeals was held for the “Produce 101” series manipulation case. The court revealed that the fourth round of voting of the show was manipulated, with trainees Lee Gaeun (14th) and Han Chowon (13th) supposed to be in the 5th and 6th place, respectively.

Notes

References

External links
  

 
AKB48 Group
Korean-language television shows
2018 South Korean television series debuts
2018 South Korean television series endings
South Korean reality television series
South Korean variety television shows
Mnet (TV channel) original programming
K-pop television series